Spouses Maryna Yuryivna Dyachenko (born 23 January 1968) and Serhiy Serhiyovych Dyachenko (14 April 1945 – 5 May 2022) (Marina Yuryevna Dyachenko (Shirshova) and Sergey Sergeyevich Dyachenko) (rus. Марина и Сергей Дяченко, ukr. Марина та Сергій Дяченки) are co-authors of fantasy literature from Ukraine writing in Russian. Three of their novels have been translated into English. At the World and All-European Science Fiction Convention Eurocon 2005 in Glasgow, Marina and Serhiy Dyachenko were recognized as the best science fiction writers in Europe.

Personal life 
The Dyachenkos are from Kyiv, Ukraine. For four years, they lived in Russia, then moved to California, United States in 2013. 

Serhiy Dyachenko died on 5 May 2022 in the United States.

Work

Background 
Serhiy Dyachenko graduated from Kyiv Medical Institute and worked as a psychiatrist.  Later, Serhiy Dyachenko working as a writer and screenwriter, together with director Anatoliy Borsyuk and cinematographer Oleksandr Frolov, was awarded the Taras Shevchenko National Prize of Ukraine in 1987 for "The Star of Vavilov" (Russian: "Звезда Вавилова") about the life of imprisoned Russian agronomist Nikolai Vavilov.  The film was produced by the Kyiv Studio of Popular Science Films.  Serhiy graduated from the Faculty of Scriptwriting of the All-Russian State University of Cinematography in 1989.  Maryna Dyachenko graduated from the Theatre Institute of Kyiv in 1989 and worked as a professional theatre and cinema actress.

Self-description and Collaboration
The Dyachenkos describe their work as "M-realism" with the 'M' "open to interpretation."  Without explaining the meaning of the "M", in 2014 Sergey Dyachenko defined it as "Marina's realism", expanding "that's where the romanticism comes from, and the stubborn humanism, and the hope for white magic and a better tomorrow."

Their work have been subject to scholarly analysis.

In a 2019 profile, Julia Meitov Hersey summarized their collaboration as follows: "It is thanks to Sergey’s skills of writing solid plots that Marina’s beautiful aethereal worlds have such a strong structure, a foundation built on the characters’ flesh and bone, their blood and tears. Their ideal fantasy is a story of a real person in a chimerical world."

Novels 
The Gate-Keeper, their first novel, was published in 1994. It received the Crystal Table prize at the book festival Zoryany Schlyach, and the novel was awarded the title "Best Debut Work" at the EuroCon competition in 1995. The Gate-keeper became the first novel in the Dyachenkos' fantasy tetralogy Wanderers ("Скитальцы"). With publishing of The Scar (1997), the sequel of The Gate-Keeper, the Dyachenkos established themselves as masters of psychological fantastic fiction. The Scar has received the  "Sword in the Stone" award for best fantasy novel in 1997.

The Ritual (1996) is about a princess and a dragon, the latter half-human. The novel received little attention and was not awarded any prizes.

Age of the Witch (1997) involves characters from a number of mythologies, most prominently Slavonic. It received a literature award from the magazine Rainbow in 1997 and the "Zilantkon" -"Great Zilant" prize in Kazan in 1998.

The Cave (1998) was awarded the "Moon Sword" prize in 1999 for the best work of "mystical literature" published between 1997 and 1999.

Burned Tower (1998) received a prize at Interpresscon competition in 1999.

The Frontier (1999), written with A. Valentinov and H. L. Oldie, was awarded the Golden Caduceus prize at the festival "Star Bridge - 2000".

The Execution (1999) received a "The Wаnderer" award in 2000 and the Reader Appreciation award "Sigma-F" in 2000 as the Novel of the Year.

Armaged-Home (1999), a work of social science fiction, takes place over a number of periods encompassing the life of its heroine and the society in which she lives. In the opinion of many critics and readers, it is one of the best of their novels.

The Green Card (2000), later adapted into a screenplay, is a work of realist fiction about residents of Kyiv who have received an opportunity to immigrate to the United States.

Magicians Can Do Anything (2001) was awarded the "Golden Caduceus" award at the 2001 Golden Bridge festival.

Valley of the Conscience was awarded the Bronze Snail, Russian science fiction - 2002, Sigma-F, and the "Golden Caduceus" award at the Golden Bridge 2002 festival.

Pandem took the "Silver Caduceus" prize at the 2003 Star Bridge 2003 festival.

Varan was awarded the "Bronze Caduceus" prize at the 2004 Star Bridge festival.
The Copper King, a fantasy novel loosely connected to it, was published in 2008.

The Pentacle, co-written A. Valentinov and G. L. Oldi, was awarded the "Golden Caduceus" prize at the 2005 Star Bridge festival.

Wild Energy. Lana (March 2006) is a fairy tale influenced by the music of the Ukrainian singer Ruslana, to whom the authors dedicated the work. It was awarded the "Bronze Caduceus" prize at the 2006 Star Bridge festival.

The Key of the Kingdom and its sequel Oberon's Word appeared in 2006. The trilogy was concluded with Evil Has No Power  (2008).

Alena and Aspirin, an unrelated psychological fantastic novel, was published in 2006. It was published in 2020 by HarperCollins as "Daughter from the Dark".

Vita Nostra was published in 2007. It was the first novel in the thematically related "Metamorphosis" cycle. The book collected dozens of awards from readers and professionals. Julia Meitov Hersey's translation of Vita Nostra was published by HarperCollins Publishers in November 2018. Digital, or Brevis Est, (2009) and Migrant, or Brevi Finietur, a work of science fiction, continue the cycle.

Possessed, an urban fantasy, was published in 2011.

Novellas
'Last Don Quixote (2000), a variation on Miguel de Cervantes' novel, became a base for a theatrical play. The novel was awarded the "Bronze Snail" (2001).

Awards
In 2001, Marina and Sergey Dyachenko were awarded the "Aelita" prize.

Literary awards

Maryna and Serhiy Dyachenko are recipients of the most prestigious literary awards in the science fiction in the Commonwealth of Independent States. Practically every novel they have written, in addition to several short stories, have received various awards.

They were honored as the ESFS's Best Writers of Europe in Eurocon 2005.

Bibliography

Some of their novels have also been translated into other languages (e.g. Polish, English, etc.).The Scar became their first major book publication in United States in February 2012 from Tor Books.

Novels
 The Gate Keeper
 The Rite
 The Scar
 Skrut
 The Successor
 Age of the Witch
 The Cave
 The Execution
 Armaged-Home
 The Adventurer
 Magicians May Do Everything
 Valley of the Conscience
 Pandem
 The Pentacle (novel with a series of the short stories; co-authored with Andrey Valentinov and H. L. Oldie)
 Varan
 Alena and Aspirine/Daughter from the Dark (published in Russian and Ukrainian)
 Wild Energy. Lana (published in Russian and Ukrainian)
 The Key of the Kingdom (published in Russian and Ukrainian)
 Oberon's Word (published in Russian and Ukrainian)
 Vita Nostra (published in English in November 2018)
 The Copper King 
 Evil Has No Power 
 Digital, or Brevis Est 
 Migrant, or Brevi Finietur 
 Possessed 
 Hundredfold (also a wordplay on Socrates)Dark World: EquilibriumThe Ray

Novellas
"Bastard"
"Stone's Roots"
"Burned Tower"
"Last Don Quixote"()
"Green Card"()
""Wolfs' Land"
"Emma and the Sphinx"
"The Well Master"
"Kon"
"Miseracle"
"Zoo"
"Two"
"My Noble Knight Has Left Me..."
"The Sail Bird"
"Vesnars' Land"

Short stories
 "Virlena"()
 "Outside"
 "The Throne"
 "Oskol"
 "Horde's Man"
 "A Tale About Golden Rooster"
 "The Spell"
 "Blind Basilisk"
 "The Hamlet"
 "Mackler and Magic"()
 "The Wing"
 "Dark Side of the Moon"
 "Basketball"
 "Hair"
 "The Bloom"
 "The Promise"
 "Lunar Landscape"
 "Marta"
 "Visit to a Paediatrician"
 "'Churrem" ("The One Who Smiles")
 "Ataman"

With A. Valentinov, H. L. Oldie
 The Frontier
 Bashtan
 Fights with no Rules
 Devil's Expedition
 The Potato
 Werewolf in the Uniform
 Bursak
 Sanatorium
 The Neighbor
 Venus Mirgorodus
 Day of the Dead in the Community Center
 Sold Soul (
 Bazaar
 Rescuers
 The Wanderer
 The Quarteronesse
 Dress Shoes
 Charisma Nuyrki Gavrosh
 Monte-Carltown
 Let's go to the Basement?
 Nespokiy
 Scary M.
 Bogdana
 The Serdolick Perl
 The Attraction
 The Pan's Orchid
 Cossack's Blood
 The Flaming Motor
 The Competition
 The Bequest Stone
 Five Dead-ends Street

Plays
 Last Don Quixote

Children's books
 Flying Hat (with A. Bondarchuk and I. Malkovich) Published in Ukrainian.
 Tales for Stevo
 Adventures of Masha Michailova; also published in Ukrainian.
 Search of Masha Michailova
 Flying fish Published in Russian, Ukrainian an English
 Giraffe and Panda Published in Russian and Ukrainian.
 Fairy Tales: About the old woman, About the barrel, About the river, About the chicken, About the chicken-2, About the cricket
 Gabriel and The Steel Lumberjack Published in Ukrainian.

Fictional creatures and objects created by writersThis section lists unique objects and creatures, which were never used in any other works, or in very obscure works, such as "Chugaister". "Glaive" (from the book Armaggedon-Home) - These are the larvae of dalphins that emerge during the apocalypse. They are deadly to all living creatures. They are extremely resilient, resistant to high temperatures, do not need shelter and are able to survive an apocalypse without taking cover. Dalphins in this novel resemble real dolphins. They have evolved to survive an apocalypse in the following way: females lay eggs once every twenty years, right before the apocalypse. Critical changes in the environment, and sometimes just the warning signs, stimulate development of the larvae. The creatures migrate back to the ocean when seismic activity is over. The next stage of their development is the cocoon. A Dalphin spends one to two months inside the cocoon before emerging as an adult. In the world of this book, mentioning of the glaives is a taboo, probably from the fear of them. The word glaive means an edged weapon that was used in the medieval times.
 "The Yellowmore" (from the book Bastard) is a wizard's trap. It looks like an old man carved out of a tree. This old man smokes a pipe that emits yellow smoke. Smoke kills living things, by homing on the body heat.
 "The Devourer" (from the book Bastard) is a wizard's trap. It is a hole in the ground that attracts its victims with a children's cry for help. Approaching victim gets sucked in by a whirlwind.
 "Calidons" (from the book The Ritual) are gigantic white birds, which live near the dragons. They pluck their own soft white feathers in order to hatch their chicks.
 "Mryga" (from the book Armaggedon-Home) is an apocalypse, that comes periodically, approximately every twenty years. During this period "The gates" are formed: objects of the unknown nature, that look like a stone arch with a mirror inside. People who enter the mirror are safe from the apocalypse and are able to return after it is over. "Minor gates" are formed as well, these are used by the animals and can not be employed by humans. There are enough gates formed, so every person has an opportunity to be saved if he/she enters the nearest one. These gates are transmitting some kind of signal, but humans were not able to determine what it is.
 "Nav", "Navka", "Nyavka" (from the book Age of the Witch) is a magic creature that takes its form after a person who has recently died. It is brought to life if someone loved that dead person and wished for him/her to come back. Nav is using deception to kill a person who brought it to life. Nav, as well as Chugaister, are taken from Ukrainian mythology, but differ from the source material in many ways. For example: in the classic Ukrainian novel The Forest Song by Lesya Ukrainka, the main characte is a Navka, a spirit of the forest or sprite.
 "Chugaister" (from the book Age of the Witch, probably taken from a book "The Forest Song" by Lesya Ukrainka ) are magical creatures that are very similar to the human. Chugaisters, sometimes by themselves, sometimes in a group, destroy Navs (see above), by dancing around them. By doing so they make Navs to dance with them until they collapse dead. Chugaister was taken from the Ukrainian mythology, but is somewhat different from the original creature.
 "Elfoush" (from the book The Well Master) is a little flying somewhat intelligent creature, which resembles an elf. Little children and people who are in love can understand what elfoushes say, thus becoming their prey.
 "Housekeeper" (from the book The Well Master'') is a little house demon, looks like a little man with spider's legs.

References

Sources
 Writers' official international website, archived from 2011
Writers' official international website, updated
  official website of the authors at www.rusf.ru 
  official website of the authors at www.fiction.ru
  official website of the authors at sf.org.kemsu.ru
  Bibliography
  lib.ru Available books in the On-line Library of Moshkov
 Vita Nostra on Amazon 
 The story behind the cover of Vita Nostra The Story Behind the Cover of Vita Nostra, by Marina & Sergey Dyachenko

External links

 Marina and Sergey Dyachenko - biography (www.rusf.ru)
 , Paweł Laudański, Marina i Siergiej Diaczenko, Esensja, 9 July 2003
 , Paweł Laudański, Wywiad z Mariną i Siergiejem Diaczenko, Esensja, 9 February 2005

1945 births
1968 births
2022 deaths
Living people
Russian science fiction writers
Ukrainian science fiction writers
Russian fantasy writers
Ukrainian fantasy writers
Russian alternate history writers
Ukrainian alternate history writers
Russian-language writers
Married couples
Women science fiction and fantasy writers
Russian women writers
Writing duos
Women historical novelists
Ukrainian emigrants to the United States